Jared Pappas-Kelley is an American curator, researcher, and visual artist. He studied at The Evergreen State College, Goddard College and the European Graduate School where he served as Graduate Teaching Assistant for both Jean-Luc Nancy and Paul D. Miller (DJ Spooky) while completing his PhD.  Pappas-Kelley also studied with filmmakers Claire Denis and Barbara Hammer whom he cites as influences on his visual work. His doctoral thesis, supervised by Sylvère Lotringer, examines the inherent instability of art objects, investigating what he terms "the thing that is not a thing"  through an examination of events such as the 2004 Momart warehouse fire and the objects stolen and subsequently lost or destroyed by art thief Stéphane Breitwieser. Much of his current research focuses on ideas of this instability of the art object and the intersection between practice and theory, examining art as a method for understanding the object’s coming together through its undoing.  Developing these themes, he is currently organizing a group exhibition that he is co-curating with Natasha Chuk entitled Solvent Forms.
  
In addition, Pappas-Kelley’s visual work, film, and installations have exhibited internationally in museums, festivals, and galleries, most recently at London gallery Five Years curated by Dennis Cooper. From 2001 until 2007, Pappas-Kelley was publisher and a founding editor of the contemporary art journal Toby Room.  His articles and writings on art appear in journals, newspapers, and anthologies, including publications such as The Rumpus, and he is a peer reviewer and serves as article editor in academic journals. His direction of the arts organization ArtRod led to the creation of the Tollbooth Gallery and Critical Line art center alongside other media projects.

Since 1999 Pappas-Kelley has toured and curated an ongoing series of expanded and experimental video/film series called Don’t Bite the Pavement.

Trivia

Pappas-Kelley’s first job after graduating from university was in the Bomis/Nupedia offices where Wikipedia was first taking form, and he along with the rest of the staff composed and played with some of the first wiki experiments there.

Pappas-Kelley made a brief appearance as a fictionalized artist Jared Pappas in the Robin Hobb novel Ship of Magic.

Filmmaker Claire Denis once described Pappas-Kelley's approach with: "Jared, well I have no words to say how much I was impressed by him, by his capability to synthesize, by his aptitude to capitalize everything not only for his own profit but also for the group."

References

External links

Official website for Pappas-Kelley
Website for ArtRod, the organization that Pappas-Kelley and Michael Lent founded which serves as the home for Toby Room, Tollbooth Gallery, and their other collaborative projects.

Living people
Goddard College alumni
Evergreen State College alumni
Year of birth missing (living people)